Naim Ulmasov (born 26 April 1992) is a Tajikistani football player who last played for FC Istiklol, and the Tajikistan national football team.

Career
He previously played for Vakhsh Qurghonteppa.
In December 2014, Ulmasov was made available for loan by Istiklol.

Career statistics

Club

International

Statistics accurate as of match played 4 September 2014

Honors
Istiklol
 Tajik League (1): 2014
 Tajik Cup (1): 2013, 2014
 Tajik Supercup (1) : 2014

References

1992 births
Living people
Tajikistani footballers
Tajikistan international footballers
Vakhsh Qurghonteppa players
Tajikistan Higher League players
FC Istiklol players
Footballers at the 2014 Asian Games
Association football defenders
Asian Games competitors for Tajikistan
Tajikistan youth international footballers